Daniel Dod (28 September 1788 Virginia – 9 May 1823 New York City) was a mathematician and a mechanical engineer.  He fabricated the engine for the first steamboat to cross the Atlantic Ocean.

Biography
Dod was educated at Rutgers College, and became distinguished for his mathematical acquirements. He was especially devoted to the construction of steam machinery, beginning when steam navigation was in its infancy, and soon became one of the most successful engine builders in the country. In 1811 he declined an appointment in Rutgers as professor of mathematics, in order to devote himself to this business. His mechanical constructions were different from former ones, and, having proved superior to all others, were generally adopted. In 1819 the “SS Savannah,” with an engine of his building, made the first steamship voyage across the Atlantic, and returned in safety after visiting England and Russia.

In 1821, Dod moved to New York City, where he was reputed the most successful engine builder in the United States. In 1823, having altered the machinery of a steamboat, he went on board to witness the effect of his repair by a trial trip on the East River. The boiler exploded, and so severely injured Dod that he died a few days thereafter.

Family
Thaddeus Dod, a Presbyterian minister, was his uncle.

References

Bibliography
 
 
 
Attribution

1788 births
1823 deaths
Engineers from Virginia
19th-century American engineers
19th-century American mathematicians
Rutgers University alumni
Deaths by explosive device